Itagonia is a genus of beetles in the family Tenebrionidae. The majority of species are found in Southwest China, but two are found in the more central and northern parts of the country, from Gansu to Hebei and Inner Mongolia. They are relatively small and robust-bodied beetles.

Species 
The following species are accepted within Itagonia:
 Itagonia baxoica 
 Itagonia bisetosa 
 Itagonia cordiformis 
 Itagonia elegans 
 Itagonia gnaptorinoides 
 Itagonia litangensis 
 Itagonia longicornis 
 Itagonia medvedevi 
 Itagonia mera 
 Itagonia provostii 
 Itagonia semenovi 
 Itagonia shamaevi 
 Itagonia szetschwana 
 Itagonia tibialis 
 Itagonia trisetosa 
 Itagonia tuberculata 
 Itagonia xinlongensis 
 Itagonia zayica

References 

Tenebrionidae
Taxa named by Edmund Reitter
Tenebrionidae genera